Charles de Meixmoron de Dombasle (1839-1912) was a French heir and painter. He inherited a ploughing implement factory from his paternal grandfather, Mathieu de Dombasle, in Nancy. He became a member of the Académie de Stanislas in 1887, and served as its president in 1900.

References

1839 births
1912 deaths
Businesspeople from Nancy, France
19th-century French painters
Artists from Nancy, France
20th-century French painters